Streltzoviella insularis is a moth in the family Cossidae. It is found in China (Heilongjiang, Liaoning, Hebei, Shandong, Anhui, Hunan, Fujian, Shanghai, Beijing, Shansi, Inner Mongolia), the southern Russian Far East, Korea and Japan. The habitat consists of nemoral forests at low elevations.

The length of the forewings is 16–19 mm. The forewings are dark-brown with a wavy pattern. The hindwings are uniform brown. Adults are on wing from June to September.

Subspecies
Streltzoviella insularis insularis
Streltzoviella insularis extrema Yakovlev, 2006 (central China)

References

Natural History Museum Lepidoptera generic names catalog

Cossinae
Moths described in 1882